Yandere Simulator is a stealth action video game currently in development by American game developer YandereDev. The game centers upon an obsessively lovesick schoolgirl named Ayano Aishi, nicknamed "Yandere-chan", who has taken it upon herself to eliminate anyone she believes is monopolizing her senpai's attention.

Story and gameplay 

The player controls Ayano Aishi (nicknamed Yandere-chan), an apathetic Japanese high school girl who has developed a crush on Taro Yamada, a fellow student nicknamed "Senpai". Over the course of ten weeks, a different girl will fall in love with Taro, becoming a target for Ayano to eliminate. The player has the ability to kidnap, torture, poison, electrocute, matchmake, befriend, betray, and drown rivals, befriend other schoolgirls, play small mini games, access a street where the player can earn money by playing a maid cafe minigame, spend money at shops to buy different types of items, and more.

Demo 
In 2020, the game's first official demo was released along with Ayano's first rival, Osana Najimi. The timeline for other rivals has not been announced.

1980s Mode 
A prequel mode, named "1980s mode" was released in October 2021. This mode is a complete story mode that follows Ayano Aishi's mother, Ryoba Aishi, and follows the same storyline as the main story. The developer has stated that this mode was created to test the games various systems. 1980s Mode features VHS effects and a new complete soundtrack in order to differentiate it from the main story.

Development 
Yandere Simulator is developed by YandereDev, a freelance game developer identified as Alex and based in Temecula, California. He first pitched the idea on 4chan in 2014, and after receiving positive feedback, decided to begin development.

YandereDev regularly releases test builds of the game for debugging purposes. At first, suggestions were accepted by email, but since 2016, he has asked for these emails to not be sent anymore, as they are "slowing down development".

On March 1, 2017, YandereDev announced a partnership with tinyBuild that would help him polish, promote, and publish the game. On June 10, 2018, YandereDev announced that the partnership ended with the company in December 2017.

, no official release date for the full game has been announced, with YandereDevs focus being on polishing up the game in preparation for the upcoming crowdfunding campaign.

Controversies

Developer allegations 
Throughout the development of Yandere Simulator, the developer, often referred to as Yandere Dev, has been subject to many allegations and controversies, with the most apparent one being fans' frustration over how long he has taken to develop the game.

Twitch Ban 
In 2016, the game was added to a list of banned explicit games by the streaming service Twitch. In a statement made to Kotaku, YandereDev blamed "self-righteous ideologies" for the ban.

References

External links 
 

Upcoming video games
Bullying in fiction
Crowdfunded video games
High school-themed video games
Indie video games
Japan in non-Japanese culture
Life simulation games
Single-player video games
Fiction about suicide
Video games developed in the United States
Video games featuring female protagonists
Video games set in Japan
Video games with alternate endings
Video games with cel-shaded animation
Windows games
Works about stalking
Video game controversies